The 1997 RCA Championships was a men's tennis tournament played on outdoor hard courts. It was the 10th edition of the event known that year as the RCA Championships, and was part of the International Series of the 1997 ATP Tour. It took place at the Indianapolis Tennis Center in Indianapolis, Indiana, United States. Ninth-seeded Jonas Björkman  won the singles title.

Finals

Singles

 Jonas Björkman defeated  Carlos Moyà 6–3, 7–6

Doubles

 Michael Tebbutt /  Mikael Tillström defeated  Jonas Björkman /  Nicklas Kulti 6–3, 6–2

References

External links
Official website
ITF – Tournament details

RCA Championships
1997
RCA Championships
RCA Championships
RCA Championships